All Your Fault may refer to:
 "All Your Fault" (Big Sean song), 2015
 "All Your Fault" (Hopsin song), 2017
 All Your Fault: Pt. 1, a 2017 extended play by Bebe Rexha
 All Your Fault: Pt. 2, a 2017 extended play by Bebe Rexha